Akademia e Futbollit is an Albanian football academy based in Tiranë. The academy was opened on 22 September 2015 by former Albania international Alban Bushi. They operate age groups between under-7s and under-21s. The club currently competes in the Kategoria Superiore U-21, the newly-formed under-21 top flight.

References

Football clubs in Albania
Association football clubs established in 2015
Football clubs in Tirana